Alapur is a constituency of the Uttar Pradesh Legislative Assembly covering the city of Alapur in the Ambedkar Nagar district of Uttar Pradesh, India.

Alapur Assembly constituency is one of five assembly constituencies in the Sant Kabir Nagar Lok Sabha constituency. Since 2008, this assembly constituency is numbered 279 amongst 403 constituencies.

Members of Legislative Assembly

Election results

2022

2017
Bharatiya Janta Party candidate Aneeta Kamal who won in last Assembly election of 2017 Uttar Pradesh Legislative Elections defeating Samajwadi Party candidate Sangeeta by a margin of 12,513 votes.

16th Vidhan Sabha: 2012 General Elections

References

External links
 

Assembly constituencies of Uttar Pradesh
Ambedkar Nagar district